This is a list of Twenty20 men's cricket records, that is a record team or individual performances in Twenty20 cricket (T20). The records only include top-level T20 games: those played in officially recognised tournaments in ICC Full-member countries or any Twenty20 International.

Team records

Highest total

Lowest innings totals

Completed innings only.

Highest winning margin (by runs)

Highest winning margin (by wickets)
, there have been 139 instances of a team winning by 10 wickets. The highest target reached without losing a wicket is 203 by Pakistan against England in September 2022 at Karachi.

Highest match aggregate

Most sixes in an innings

Most Fours in an innings

Most sixes in a match

Most fours in a match

Individual records (batting)

Highest individual score

Highest individual score (Progression of Record)

Highest individual score (by batting position)

Most career runs

Most scores over 50

Most half-centuries in career

Most centuries in a career

Fastest 100

Fastest 50

Fastest to multiples of 1000 runs

Highest career strike rate 
Qualification: 500 balls.

Highest strike rates in an innings

Highest career average 
Qualification: 50 innings.

Most career sixes

Most sixes in an innings

Most career Fours

Most fours in an innings

Most career boundaries

Most runs in a calendar year

Most runs in a series

Most ducks in career

Most consecutive innings without a duck

No ducks in career

Most Innings before first duck

Individual records (bowling)

Best figures in a match

Most career wickets

Best career strike rate

Best career bowling average

Best career economy rate

Most four-wickets-in-an-innings (and over) in a career

Most five-wicket hauls in a career

Most maidens in a career

Most Wickets in a calendar year

Most runs conceded in a match

Most wickets in a series

Individual records (fielding)

Most dismissals in career as wicket keeper 
Only dismissals and innings played as wicketkeeper counted, some of the players have also taken catches as fielders.

Most catches in career by wicket keeper

Most stumpings in career

Most dismissals in series as wicket keeper

Most catches in career by fielder

Most catches in series as fielder

Individual records (other)

Most matches played

Most matches as captain

Most matches won as captain

Most Player of the Match Awards

Partnership records

Record wicket partnerships

 Note: An asterisk (*) signifies an unbroken partnership (i.e. neither of the batsmen were dismissed before either the end of the allotted overs or when they reached their required score).

Highest partnerships (any wicket)

Individual Records (Officials)

Most matches as an umpire

See also
Twenty20

References

External links
 "Records  Twenty20 matches  ESPNcricinfo"

Twenty20 cricket lists
Cricket records and statistics
Twenty20 cricket